Omonville-la-Rogue is a former commune in the Manche department in Normandy in north-western France. On 1 January 2017, it was merged into the new commune La Hague. It is the site of one of the few ports on this rugged coastline.

See also
Communes of the Manche department

References

Omonvillelarogue